Ann Barnes (born Dixie Ann Cheney; June 17, 1945 – September 13, 2005) was an American actress and pop singer, best known for appearing as Cookie Bumstead on the short-lived television series Blondie (1957), based on the popular Chic Young comic strip.

Biography 
Barnes attracted a casting director's attention because of her resemblance to Pamela Britton, who played the title role.

When Blondie was cancelled after 28 episodes, Barnes appeared on other television series, including NBC Matinee Theater, Leave it to Beaver, and My Three Sons.

When even these acting roles dried up, Barnes took a brief stab at a recording career, recording a bouncy pop ballad called "Whispering Wind", circa 1962. Recording under the name Dixie Ann Barnes, she sang about every teenage girl's lament: puppy love. "Whispering Wind" can be found on the pop CD anthologies Soda Pop Babies and Restless Doll. Barnes is pictured on the cover of Soda Pop Babies.

According to the liner notes in Soda Pop Babies, Barnes was crowned the "Princess of Hollywood" for April 1962, by the Hollywood Chamber of Commerce.

According to long-time colleague and fellow child actor Paul Petersen, Barnes had a difficult childhood at the hands of abusive parents. In her adult life, she rarely spoke about her years in show business, and reclaimed her birth name of Dixie Ann Cheney.

Barnes eventually returned to her birth town of Lansing, Michigan, to retire. She died on September 13, 2005. According to Petersen, the body of this forgotten, exploited talent was not discovered for almost a week.

In 2005, Petersen wrote a loving tribute to his colleague and friend on his website devoted to advocacy for former and current child performers, A Minor Consideration. Entitled "When Sparrows Fall", Petersen recounts the tragic lives and obscure deaths of two underappreciated child actors, Ann Barnes and Tommy Bond.

Notes

References 
 Peterson, Paul. "When Sparrows Fall."
 Soda Pop Babies. Audio CD, Classics Records #715

External links 

"When Sparrows Fall." at A Minor Consideration

1945 births
2005 deaths
20th-century American actresses
American child actresses
American women pop singers
American television actresses
Actresses from Lansing, Michigan
Musicians from Lansing, Michigan
Singers from Michigan
20th-century American women singers
20th-century American singers
21st-century American women